The Vogelkop whistler (Pachycephala meyeri) is a species of bird in the family Pachycephalidae.
It is endemic to West Papua, Indonesia. Its natural habitat is subtropical or tropical moist montane forests.

Alternate names for the Vogelkop whistler include the grey-crowned whistler and Meyer's whistler.

References

Vogelkop whistler
Birds of the Doberai Peninsula
Vogelkop whistler
Taxonomy articles created by Polbot